The 2015 Georgia State Panthers baseball team represented Georgia State University in the 2015 NCAA Division I baseball season.  The Panthers played their home games at the GSU Baseball Complex.

Personnel

2015 Roster

Coaching Staff

Schedule

! style="background:#0000FF;color:white;"| Regular Season
|- valign="top" 

|- bgcolor="#ccffcc"
| 1 || February 13 ||  || GSU Baseball Complex || 11–3 || 1–0 || –
|- align="center" bgcolor="#ffccc"
| 2 || February 14 ||  || GSU Baseball Complex || 7–10 || 1–1 || –
|- align="center" bgcolor="#ffccc"
| 3 || February 15 ||  || GSU Baseball Complex || 1–9 || 1–2 || –
|- bgcolor="#ccffcc"
| 4 || February 17 ||  || Macon, GA || 14–1 || 2–2 || –
|- bgcolor="#ccffcc"
| 5 || February 20 ||   || GSU Baseball Complex || 5–3 || 3–2 || –
|- align="center" bgcolor="#ffccc"
| 6 || February 21 || UMass Lowell || GSU Baseball Complex || 3–5 || 3–3 || –
|- bgcolor="#ccffcc"
| 7 || February 21 || UMass Lowell || GSU Baseball Complex || 11–9 || 4–3 || –
|- align="center" bgcolor="#ffccc"
| 8 || February 22 || UMass Lowell || GSU Baseball Complex || 2–9 || 4–4 || –
|- bgcolor="#ffffff"
| 9 || February 25 || Georgia Tech || Atlanta, GA || Cancelled || – || –
|- bgcolor="#ccffcc"
| 10 || February 27 ||  || GSU Baseball Complex || 10–8 || 5–4 || –
|- bgcolor="#ccffcc"
| 11 || February 28 || Ohio || GSU Baseball Complex || 11–4 || 6–4 || –
|-

|- bgcolor="#ccffcc"
| 12 || March 1 || Ohio || GSU Sports Arena || 3–1 || 7–4 || –
|- align="center" bgcolor="#ffccc"
| 13 || March 4 ||   || Athens, GA || 2–4 || 7–5 || –
|- bgcolor="#ccffcc"
| 14 || March 6 ||  || GSU Baseball Complex || 8–5 || 8–5 || –
|- bgcolor="#ccffcc"
| 15 || March 7 || Eastern Michigan || GSU Baseball Complex || 5–4 || 9–5 || –
|- align="center" bgcolor="#ffccc"
| 16 || March 8 || Eastern Michigan || GSU Baseball Complex || 1–3 || 9–6 || –
|- bgcolor="#ccffcc"
| 17 || March 11 ||   || GSU Baseball Complex || 13–3 || 10–6 || –
|- bgcolor="#ccffcc"
| 18 || March 13 ||  || Jonesboro, AR || 5–4 || 11–6 || 1–0
|- bgcolor="#ccffcc"
| 19 || March 14 || Arkansas State || Jonesboro, AR || 6–3 || 12–6 || 2–0
|- bgcolor="#ccffcc"
| 20 || March 15 || Arkansas State || Jonesboro, AR || Cancelled || – || –
|- bgcolor="#ccffcc"
| 21 || March 17 ||  Florida A&M || GSU Baseball Complex || 12–11 || 13–6 || 2–0
|- align="center" bgcolor="#ffccc"
| 22 || March 18 ||  || Savannah, GA || 3–7 || 13–7 || 2–0
|- bgcolor="#ccffcc"
| 23 || March 20 || Louisiana–Lafayette || GSU Baseball Complex || 7–6 || 14–7 || 3–0
|- align="center" bgcolor="#ffccc"
| 24 || March 21 || Louisiana-Lafayette || GSU Baseball Complex || 1–10 || 14–8 || 3–1
|- align="center" bgcolor="#ffccc"
| 25 || March 21 || Louisiana–Lafayette || GSU Baseball Complex || 2–3 || 14–9 || 3–2
|- align="center" bgcolor="#ffccc"
| 26 || March 23 ||  || GSU Baseball Complex || 2–3 || 14–10 || 3–2
|- align="center" bgcolor="#ffccc"
| 27 || March 24 ||  || GSU Baseball Complex || 1–3 || 14–11 || 3–2
|- align="center" bgcolor="#ffccc"
| 28 || March 24 || Alabama A&M || GSU Baseball Complex || 9–10 || 14–12 || 3–2
|- bgcolor="#ccffcc"
| 29 || March 27 ||  || Arlington, TX || 5–2 || 15–12 || 4–2
|- bgcolor="#ccffcc"
| 30 || March 28 || Texas–Arlington || Arlington, TX || 6–4 || 16–12 || 5–2
|- bgcolor="#ccffcc"
| 31 || March 29 || Texas–Arlington || Arlington, TX || 2–1 || 17–12 || 6–2
|-

|- align="center" bgcolor="#ffccc"
| 32 || April 1 || Georgia Tech || GSU Baseball Complex || 3–6 || 17–13 || 6–2
|- bgcolor="#ccffcc"
| 33 || April 3 ||  || GSU Baseball Complex || 13–8 || 18–13 || 7–2
|- bgcolor="#ccffcc"
| 34 || April 4 || Arkansas–Little Rock || GSU Baseball Complex || 12–5 || 19–13 || 8–2
|- align="center" bgcolor="#ffccc"
| 35 || April 5 || Arkansas–Little Rock || GSU Baseball Complex || 2–4 || 19–14 || 8–3
|- align="center" bgcolor="#ffccc"
| 36 || April 8 ||  || Auburn, AL || 2–4 || 19–15 || 8–3
|- bgcolor="#ccffcc"
| 37 || April 11 || Louisiana–Monroe || GSU Baseball Complex || 7–6 || 20–15 || 9–3
|- bgcolor="#ccffcc"
| 38 || April 11 || Louisiana–Monroe || GSU Baseball Complex || 5–3 || 21–15 || 10–3
|- bgcolor="#ccffcc"
| 39 || April 12 || Louisiana–Monroe || GSU Baseball Complex || 9–0 || 22–15 || 11–3
|- bgcolor="#ffffff"
| 40 || April 14 || Mercer || GSU Baseball Complex || Cancelled || – || –
|- bgcolor="#ccffcc"
| 41 || April 17 ||  || Boone, NC || 4–3 || 23–15 || 12–3
|- bgcolor="#ccffcc"
| 42 || April 18 || Appalachian State || Boone, NC || 15–13 || 24–15 || 13–3
|- bgcolor="#ffffff"
| 43 || April 19 || Appalachian State || Boone, NC || Cancelled || – || –
|- bgcolor="#ccffcc"
| 44 || April 21 || Oglethorpe University || GSU Baseball Complex || 6–2 || 25–15 || 13–3
|- bgcolor="#ccffcc"
| 45 || April 22 || Savannah State || GSU Baseball Complex || 10–5 || 26–15 || 13–3
|- align="center" bgcolor="#ffccc"
| 46 || April 24 ||  || Mobile, AL || 0–8 || 26–16 || 13–4
|- align="center" bgcolor="#ffccc"
| 47 || April 25 || South Alabama || Mobile, AL || 1–2 || 26–17 || 13–5
|- align="center" bgcolor="#ffccc"
| 48 || April 26 || South Alabama || Mobile, AL || 2–7 || 26–18 || 13–6
|-

|- align="center" bgcolor="#ffccc"
| 49 || May 1 ||  || GSU Baseball Complex || 2–12 || 26–19 || 13–7
|- bgcolor="#ccffcc"
| 50 || May 2 || Texas State || GSU Baseball Complex || 10–5 || 27–19 || 14–7
|- align="center" bgcolor="#ffccc"
| 51 || May 3 || Texas State || GSU Baseball Complex || 5–8 || 27–20 || 14–8
|- bgcolor="#ccffcc"
| 52 || May 6 || Kennesaw State || Kennesaw, GA || 7–4 || 28–20 || 14–8
|- align="center" bgcolor="#ffccc"
| 53 || May 8 ||  || Troy, AL || 2–4 || 28–21 || 14–9
|- align="center" bgcolor="#ffccc"
| 54 || May 9 || Troy || Troy, AL || 2–3 || 28–22 || 14–10
|- align="center" bgcolor="#ffccc"
| 55 || May 10 || Troy || Troy, AL || 0–2 || 28–23 || 14–11
|- bgcolor="#ccffcc"
| 56 || May 14 ||   || GSU Baseball Complex || 6–2 || 29–23 || 15–11
|- align="center" bgcolor="#ffccc"
| 57 || May 15 || Georgia Southern || GSU Baseball Complex || 3–4 || 29–24 || 15–12
|- align="center" bgcolor="#ffccc"
| 58 || May 16 || Georgia Southern || GSU Baseball Complex || 2–3 || 29–25 || 15–13
|-

|-
! style="background:#0000FF;color:white;"| Post-Season
|- 

|- bgcolor="#ccffcc"
| 59 || May 20 || Georgia Southern || Troy, AL || 3–2 || 30–25 || 15–13 || 
|- align="center" bgcolor="#ffccc"
| 60 || May 21 || South Alabama || Troy, AL || 4–14 || 30–26 || 15–13 || 
|- align="center" bgcolor="#ffccc"
| 61 || May 22 || Arkansas State || Troy, AL || 2–6 || 30–27 || 15–13 || 
|-

|-
|

References

Georgia State
Georgia State Panthers baseball seasons